is a 2005 Japanese film directed by Kudo Kankuro.  The film stars several well-known and highly respected Japanese actors.

The story follows two Edo-era gay men, Yaji Robei (Yaji) and Kita Hachi (Kita), on a pilgrimage to Ise Shrine.  It is loosely based on the Tōkaidōchū Hizakurige.

Plot
Yaji and Kita are two men who live in Edo.  They are deeply in love.  Yaji is married to a woman, while Kita is an actor addicted to various drugs.

One day, they receive an advertisement for the Grand Shrine at Ise, and decide to set out on a pilgrimage there, hoping to cure Kita of his drug addiction.  They set out on a modern motorcycle but are forced to turn back and walk the Tōkaidō road to Ise, encountering various characters and obstacles along the way.

Cast
 Yaji: Nagase Tomoya from the band TOKIO
 Kita: Nakamura Shichinosuke, a well-known kabuki actor
 Kin-kin: Sadao Abe
 Ohatsu: Koike Eiko, a Japanese idol
 Hige no oiran (the bearded courtesan): Suzuki Matsuo
 King Arthur: Nakamura Kanzaburō, a kabuki actor
 Bartender: Arata
 Bartender's wife: Aso Kumiko
 Spirit of the dead: Arakawa Yoshiyoshi
 Non-non: Emoto Tasuku
 Naniwa Hotto: Itsuji Itao
 Foreman: Iwamatsu Ryō
 Vendor: Minagawa Sarutoki
 Landlady: Morishita Aiko
 Newsdealer: Namase Katsuhisa
 Tourists: Ogi Hiroaki, Yahagi Ken
 Samurai: Nao Ōmori
 Oyuki: Shimizu Yumi
 Tower Phonographs owner: Shiriagari Kotobuki
 Takeuchi Riki: Kimura Shonoshin
 Policeman: Terajima Susumu
 Fantom Yaji: Tsumabuki Satoshi
 Old man: Kazuo Umezu
 Ochin: Yamaguchi Tomomitsu

References

External links
 official site (written in Japanese)
 IMDb entry

2005 films
2000s Japanese-language films
2005 comedy films
Samurai films
Japanese LGBT-related films
Films with screenplays by Kankurō Kudō
LGBT-related comedy films
Gay-related films
2005 LGBT-related films
2000s Japanese films